William Dietrich may refer to:
 William E. Dietrich (born 1950), American geologist
 William S. Dietrich II (1938–2011), American steel industry executive and philanthropist
 William Dietrich (novelist) (born 1951), American novelist
 Bill Dietrich (1910–1978), American Major League Baseball pitcher

See also
 Dietrich (disambiguation)